Hilmar Árni Halldórsson (born 14 February 1992) is an Icelandic football forward, who currently plays for Stjarnan.

International career
Hilmar was involved with the U-19 team, and made his senior team debut in an unofficial friendly against Indonesia on 14 January 2018.

References

External links

Halldorsson, Hilmar Arni
Halldorsson, Hilmar Arni
Icelandic footballers
Halldorsson, Hilmar Arni
Iceland youth international footballers
Iceland international footballers